Unmad, the Sanskrit word for mad or insane, has been used as the name of a monthly satire magazine in Bangladesh. The magazine was founded by Ishtiaq Hossain and Kazi Khaleed Ashraf in 1978 and tries to ape MAD Magazine. Bangladeshi cartoonist Ahsan Habib is its present chief editor.

Applications for iPhone and Android of the magazine was launched on April 9, 2013 by Reverie Corporation Limited.

Publishing history
Unmad was founded in Dhaka, Bangladesh by Kazi Khaleed Ashraf and Ishtiaq Hossain. The first issue was dated May 1978. The schedule was initially quarterly, but it switched to a monthly schedule in 1991. Normally, each issue is 28 pages, with longer special issues at the two holidays Eid al-Fitr and Eid al-Adha.

Writers

 Ahsan Habib
 Ishtiaq Hossain
 Kazi Khaleed Ashraf

Artists
 Ahsan Habib
 Ishtiaq Hossain
 Kazi Khaleed Ashraf
 Mehedi Haque
 Tanmoy
 Arif Iqbal
 Faridur Reza Razib
 Hasib Kamal
 Eeha Nawar
 Biplob
 Muhammad Ayan

References

External links

1978 establishments in Bangladesh
Monthly magazines published in Bangladesh
Magazines established in 1978
Satirical magazines
Bengali-language magazines